DENN domain-containing protein 1A is a protein that in humans is encoded by the DENND1A gene.

References

Further reading